Cherry Valley Township may refer to the following places in the United States:

 Cherry Valley Township, Winnebago County, Illinois
 Cherry Valley Township, Michigan
 Cherry Valley Township, Carroll County, Missouri
 Cherry Valley Township, Ashtabula County, Ohio

Township name disambiguation pages